Yair Vardi is an Israeli dancer and choreographer, a member of the second generation of the Batsheva Dance Company. He is the Director of the Suzanne Dellal Centre for Dance and Theatre.

Biography
Vardi was born in May 1948, in Kibbutz Kfar Blum in the Upper Galilee. In 1977 he was awarded the Kinor David Prize. He danced with Ballet Rambert in London and later started his own company, English Dance Theatre, as well as a center for dance called Dancity in Newcastle, England. After 12 years away from Israel, he returned to become the Director of the Suzanne Dellal Centre upon its founding.

Awards
Vardi has been awarded numerous distinctions, among them:
 The Kinor David Prize (1977)
 The Tel Aviv Municipality Honor and Achievement in the Arts (2002)
 Shield of Honor for exceptional contribution to the exporting of Israeli Culture, Ministry of Foreign Affairs (2009)
 Chevallier de l'Ordre des Arts et des Lettres, by the French Government (2009)
 EMET Prize for Science, Art and Culture, sponsored by the Prime Minister of Israel (2010)

References

Israeli male dancers
Israeli choreographers
1948 births

Living people